Clinton: His Struggle with Dirt is a satire from 1998 written and narrated by Armando Iannucci, in a similar style to his later shows, such as Time Trumpet. Purporting to be a documentary from the future (2028), it casts actors as older versions of real people, such as Bill Clinton and Monica Lewinsky, who are depicted in a comic account of the Lewinsky scandal.

External links

Political satirical television series
1990s British satirical television series
1998 British television series debuts
1998 British television series endings
BBC television comedy
Cultural depictions of Bill Clinton
Cultural depictions of Monica Lewinsky
Political mockumentaries
Fiction set in 2028
Television series set in the 2020s